The 1988 DFB-Supercup was the second DFB-Supercup, an annual football match contested by the winners of the previous season's Bundesliga and DFB-Pokal competitions.

The match was played at the Waldstadion in Frankfurt, and contested by league champions Werder Bremen and cup winners Eintracht Frankfurt. Bremen won the match 2–0 for their first title.

Teams

Match

Details

See also
 1987–88 Bundesliga
 1987–88 DFB-Pokal

References

1988
SV Werder Bremen matches
Eintracht Frankfurt matches
1988–89 in German football cups